The 2010 Arkansas Diamonds season was the franchise's eleventh season as a football franchise, first in the Indoor Football League, and only season as the "Arkansas Diamonds". The team, led by head coach Danton Barto, played their home games at the Verizon Arena in North Little Rock, Arkansas. The Diamonds finished the regular season with an 11-3 record (6-1 in division play) and first place in the 2010 Lonestar East Division. The team's playoff run ended with a loss to the Billings Outlaws in the Intense Conference Finals. For the 2011 season, the team relocated to Texas as the Allen Wranglers.

Off-field moves

After the af2 league folded following the 2009 season, the Arkansas Twisters initially joined the newly formed Arena Football 1 but shifting league structure and concerns for stability lead to a November 2009 announcement that the team had jumped to the Indoor Football League. However, the rights to the names and logos of the former af2 teams belonged to Arena Football 1. Given the option of paying to buy or lease the trademarks, the Arkansas franchise chose instead to hold a "name the team" contest in late January and became the "Arkansas Diamonds" for the 2010 season. (There had been another unrelated "Arkansas Diamonds" in the Southwest Independent Soccer League from 1989 to 1991 and in 1994 in the United States Interregional Soccer League. Arkansas is the site of the only diamond mine in the United States.) The new team colors for 2010 were Carolina blue, black, and gray.

Diamonds head coach Danton Barto had been coaching the Manchester Wolves in af2 for the 2008 and 2009 seasons. He was the head coach of the Las Vegas Gladiators of the Arena Football League in 2007. In 2005, Barto was head coach of the Memphis Xplorers and led them to win ArenaCup VI, the 2005 af2 championship.

As the season came to a close, rumors circulated (later proved true) that the team's ownership wanted to move the franchise as soon as possible for financial reasons. One reporter compared the team's playoff run to the 1989 comedy Major League in which the players rally to win in order to frustrate the owner's relocation plans. Two months after the playoffs, in September 2009, team owner Jim Smith announced that the franchise was relocating to Allen, Texas, a prosperous suburb of Dallas.

Roster moves
The team held its first open tryout for the 2010 season on December 12, 2009, at the D1 Sports Training Center in Little Rock, Arkansas. Prospects paid $50 to register and were judged on their performance in the 40-yard dash and 20-yard shuttle, vertical jump and agility challenges, plus select skills specific to each position. To expand its search for players, the team held a second open tryout on January 17, 2010, on the campus of Ouachita Baptist University in Arkadelphia, Arkansas.

On December 15, the team announced that its first official player signing for the 2010 season was arena football quarterback James Pinkney. He had spent the 2009 season as the quarterback of the af2's Manchester Wolves.

The Diamonds opened their 2010 training camp on February 15, less than two weeks before the start of the 2010 season. The camp used the practice facilities at Jacksonville High School in Jacksonville, Arkansas, and Cabot High School in Cabot, Arkansas.

In post-season honors, Diamonds defensive lineman Luis Vasquez was named all-IFL second team.

Schedule

Regular season

Playoffs

Standings

Roster

References

External links
Texas Revolution official website

Arkansas Diamonds
Arkansas Twisters seasons
Arkansas Diamonds